This is a list of notable Trinidadian British people.

Wiley – Rapper and Grime Founder
AJ Tracey – Rapper
Nina Baden-Semper – actress
Mona Baptiste – actress and singer
Floella Benjamin – actress, author, television presenter, businesswoman and politician (Baroness Benjamin)
Chris Birchall – footballer, recipient of a CM Medal and currently with Coventry City
Chris Bisson – actor, East Is East, Coronation Street and Shameless; father and grandfather from Trinidad, great-grandfather was Indian
Danny Cipriani – rugby union footballer; father was from Trinidad
MF DOOM – rapper and record producer
Nubya Garcia – jazz musician; grandfather and grandmother from Trinidad
Darcus Howe – journalist, broadcaster, activist
Trevor McDonald – newsreader and journalist
Althea McNish – artist and designer
V. S. Naipaul – award winning author and Nobel laureates
Billy Ocean – singer, born in Trinidad
Michael Page – professional boxer and mixed martial artist; father was from Trinidad
Jadon Sancho – footballer for Borussia Dortmund and England; parents are from Trinidad
Corinne Skinner-Carter – actor
Don Warrington – actor
Jodie Williams – sprinter; mother was from Trinidad

See also 
 Trinidadian British
 List of Trinidadians

References 

Trinidad and Tobago
Trinidadian Britons
List
Britons